Lauren Keyana "Keke" Palmer (born August 26, 1993) is an American actress, singer and television personality. Known for playing leading and character roles in comedy and drama productions, she has received several accolades, including a Primetime Emmy Award, five NAACP Image Awards, and nominations for a Daytime Emmy Award and a Screen Actors Guild Award. Time magazine included her on their list of most influential people in the world in 2019.

Palmer made her acting debut in Barbershop 2: Back in Business (2004). She later appeared in the television film The Wool Cap (2004), and had her breakthrough starring in the drama film Akeelah and the Bee (2006). Her debut studio album, So Uncool, was released in 2007, and she progressed as a child actress with roles in Madea's Family Reunion (2006), Jump In! (2007), The Longshots (2008) and Shrink (2009). She played a number of roles on Nickelodeon, such as the title character in the sitcom True Jackson, VP (2008–2011), providing the voice of Aisha in the Nickelodeon revival of Winx Club (2011–2014), and headlining the television film Rags (2012). 

Palmer made her transition to mature roles with the VH1 biographical film CrazySexyCool: The TLC Story (2013). From 2014 to 2015 she starred as Ella in Rodgers + Hammerstein's Cinderella on Broadway. She has since starred in television series such as the Fox satirical horror series Scream Queens (2015–2016), the Epix drama series Berlin Station (2017–2019), the slasher series Scream (2019), and the Facebook Watch series Turnt Up with the Taylors (2021) for which she received a Primetime Emmy Award. She also starred in films such as Animal (2014), Hustlers (2019) and Jordan Peele's Nope (2022).

Since So Uncool, Palmer has released three extended plays: Lauren (2016), Virgo Tendencies, Pt. 1 (2019) and Virgo Tendencies, Pt. 2 (2020). She hosted the talk show Just Keke (2014) and co-hosted the talk show Strahan, Sara and Keke (2019–2020), the latter earning her a Daytime Emmy Award nomination for Outstanding Entertainment Talk Show Host.

Early life
Lauren Keyana Palmer was born on August 26, 1993, in Harvey, Illinois and raised in nearby Robbins, Illinois. She grew up in a Catholic household. Her parents, Sharon and Lawrence "Larry" Palmer, who met in drama school, had both worked as professional actors before settling into full-time jobs. Her father works for a polyurethane company, and her mother is a high school teacher who works with autistic children. Her father is a Catholic deacon. The nickname "Keke" is not a shortening of "Keyana": according to Palmer, her name came about because her older sister had an imaginary friend named Keke before she was born. Palmer first sang in a church and performed at a stage show at a Chicago tourist destination. In 2002, Palmer auditioned for a stage production of The Lion King at age nine.

Career

2000–2012: Child acting and rise to prominence

In 2004, she gained her first film role in Barbershop 2: Back in Business. In 2005, Palmer signed a record deal with Atlantic Records. That same year, she was featured in the television film Knights of the South Bronx, as well as starring in the television series Second Time Around and ER. That same year, producer Ralph Farquhar helped Palmer book the starring role in a Disney Channel pilot titled Keke and Jamal. The pilot was not picked up, and never aired.

In 2006, Palmer had her acting breakthrough starring in the film Akeelah and the Bee, playing the titular Akeelah, a bright 11-year-old who comes from a poor neighborhood and competes in the Scripps National Spelling Bee. Moira Macdonald of The Seattle Times wrote that Palmer "makes an appealing heroine". For the role, she won a Black Reel Award and an NAACP Image Award. She also had a supporting role in the 2006 film Madea's Family Reunion. The following year, Palmer appeared in the thriller Cleaner. She portrayed a lead role in the television film Jump In! Palmer also starred in two television programs Tyler Perry's House of Payne and Just Jordan. Palmer released her debut album So Uncool on September 18, 2007. The album charted at number 86 on the US Billboard Top R&B/Hip-Hop Albums chart.

In 2008, Palmer began her starring role as the title character in Nickelodeon sitcom True Jackson, VP. Palmer also wrote and performed the theme song for the series. Palmer earned $20,000 per episode of True Jackson, VP, which made her the fourth-highest-paid child star on television. In July 2009, designer Jane Siskin created a Walmart fashion line inspired by True Jackson, VP, with all the designs being approved by Palmer. She also played the lead role in the 2008 film The Longshots. True Jackson, VP ended in 2011. Palmer debuted as the voice of Aisha in Nickelodeon's revival of Winx Club. She received an NAACP Image Award nomination for her voiceover work. In 2012, Palmer starred in the film Joyful Noise, released in January 2012. She produced and starred in Rags, a television musical film, as well as voiced Peaches in Ice Age: Continental Drift. In July 2012, Palmer released the single "You Got Me" featuring Kevin McCall. The video for the single was released on July 11, 2012. She released a self-titled mixtape Keke Palmer on October 1, 2012.

2013–present: Mainstream success
In 2013, Palmer portrayed Rozonda "Chilli" Thomas in the TLC biopic, CrazySexyCool: The TLC Story, which aired in October on VH1. She next starred in the horror film Animal; it was released on June 17, 2014. She then recurred during the second season of Showtime's drama series Masters of Sex, portraying Coral, a nanny. That same year, Palmer hosted a daytime talk show on BET titled Just Keke. In doing so, she became one of the youngest talk show hosts in television history; the show itself has been regarded as "groundbreaking" and "refreshing". In September 2014, Palmer became the first African American to star as the title character in the musical Cinderella on Broadway. She performed her final show during the closing night of the show's run on January 4, 2015. Later that year, Palmer announced that she had signed with Island Records.

Between September 2015 and December 2016, she starred as Zayday Williams in the horror comedy series Scream Queens, created by Ryan Murphy. In January 2016, Palmer starred as Marty Maraschino in the television special Grease: Live. Rolling Stones Britany Spanos regarded Palmer's performance "a standout" and highlighted her "assertiveness, confidence and biting sense of humor". In June, Palmer released Waited to Exhale, an album she wrote during her time on True Jackson, VP that went unreleased due to label issues and her "anxiety-driven hesitance". On November 4, Palmer released her second extended play, titled Lauren, with a 17-minute short film of the same name being released exclusively on Billboards website. In 2017, Palmer released her memoir, I Don't Belong to You: Quiet the Noise and Find Your Voice. That same year, she joined the drama series Berlin Station during its second season.

In April 2019, Palmer began guest co-hosting ABC's daytime talk show Strahan and Sara, sporadically filling in for co-host Michael Strahan and more regularly beginning in June during co-host Sara Haines's maternity leave. She joined the slasher television series Scream as a series regular in its third season, portraying a character named Kym Johnson, which premiered on July 8, 2019. On August 26, Palmer became a third permanent co-host of Strahan and Sara, which was then re-titled Strahan, Sara and Keke. In September, Palmer starred as a "lovestruck stripper" in the crime drama film Hustlers, directed by Lorene Scafaria. She sang the song "Giants" as part of a virtual group named True Damage, in which she voices a character named Senna, in the video game League of Legends for the 2019 World Championship. The song features singers Becky G and Soyeon as well as rappers Duckwrth and Thutmose as the other group members. In November, True Damage performed the song live during the opening ceremony of the finals.

Strahan, Sara and Keke ended unexpectedly in March 2020 when the COVID-19 pandemic ended live studio programming through the industry, and ABC decided to shift the timeslot towards news. Palmer later received a Daytime Emmy Award nomination for Outstanding Entertainment Talk Show Host alongside Haines and Strahan. That same year, Palmer began starring in a web television comedy series titled Turnt Up with the Taylors, in which she portrays all of the characters. She released an extended play titled Virgo Tendencies, Pt. 1 on August 28. On August 30, Palmer hosted the 2020 MTV Video Music Awards, during which she also performed her song "Snack". She released a follow-up EPVirgo Tendencies, Pt. 2in December 2020. The following year, Palmer won the Primetime Emmy Award for Outstanding Actress in a Short Form Comedy or Drama Series for her performance in Turnt Up with the Taylors. In the same year, Palmer briefly hosted a reboot of the classic 90's MTV dating show Singled Out with Joel Kim Booster as her co-host for the short-lived online streaming service network Quibi.

In 2021, Palmer hosted the reality competition series Foodtastic for Disney+. In 2022, Palmer starred in Alice, directed by Krystin Ver Linden, which had its world premiere at the 2022 Sundance Film Festival. She also served as narrator on Not So Pretty, a documentary investigating the beauty industry directed by Kirby Dick and Amy Ziering for HBO Max. Palmer voiced the character of Izzy Hawthorne in the Pixar animated film Lightyear, a spinoff of the Toy Story film series. 
That same year she starred as Emerald Haywood in the Jordan Peele-directed science-fiction horror Nope for which she received critical attention; her performance won the New York Film Critics Circle Award for Best Supporting Actress. In 2022 Palmer debuted as host of an NBC reboot of the game show Password, with Jimmy Fallon as executive producer/permanent celebrity guest. On February 9, 2023 it was announced that she was set to star alongside Sacha Baron Cohen in the David O. Russell film "Super Toys." The film is a period piece set in the 1970s. In the last three episodes of Karma's World, in September 2022, Palmer voiced Cece Dupree, a conniving and ruthless rapper.

Artistry 
Palmer's first studio album, So Uncool, was heavily influenced by contemporary R&B, being described as "bright, bouncy, and melodic enough to appeal to teens and pre-teens. Fans of dancey teen pop will want to give this auspicious debut a listen". Palmer was influenced by American R&B singers Ciara, Janet Jackson, Michael Jackson, Mariah Carey, Aaliyah, Brandy, Mary J. Blige, and Whitney Houston as well as girl group TLC. Among her urban influences, Palmer also cites pop artists Gwen Stefani and Avril Lavigne.

Personal life 
Palmer works with the Boys' and Girls' Clubs of the American charity Cool To Be Smart program, speaking to children about the importance of learning. She is also a supporter of Urban Farming and the Girl Scouts. She has worked with the YWCA and Saving Our Daughters. As of 2010, Palmer has been a representative for the Saving Our Daughters project, an anti-bullying campaign. She is a supporter of the Black Lives Matter movement. She was included in the Times 100 Next list in November 2019, which "spotlights 100 rising stars who are shaping the future of business, entertainment, sports, politics, science, health and more." In 2020, she marched in Hollywood, California, as part of the George Floyd protests. That same year, she addressed the movement during her opening monologue at the 2020 MTV Video Music Awards.

Palmer has said she does not want her sexuality defined by labels and said that people should be fluid with labelling themselves, as their identities can change. She has struggled with anxiety and depression. In 2019, as part of the #YouKnowMe campaign, she shared via Twitter that she had an abortion at the age of 24. Palmer has been dealing with polycystic ovary syndrome her entire life.

While hosting Saturday Night Live on December 3, 2022, Palmer announced she was pregnant with her first child with boyfriend Darius Jackson. Their son was born in February 2023.

Filmography

Film

Television

Discography

Studio albums
 So Uncool (2007)

Concert tours

Headlining
 Footworkin' Concert Tour (2007)

Co-headlining
 Radio Disney Jingle Jam  (2007)

Awards and nominations

References

External links

 
 

1993 births
21st-century American actresses
21st-century American singers
21st-century American women singers
Actresses from Illinois
African-American actresses
African-American child actresses
21st-century African-American women singers
African-American women singer-songwriters
African-American television personalities
American child actresses
American child singers
American contemporary R&B singers
American women pop singers
American women singer-songwriters
American film actresses
American hip hop singers
American television actresses
American television talk show hosts
American voice actresses
Atlantic Records artists
Child pop musicians
Interscope Records artists
Island Records artists
Living people
People from Harvey, Illinois
People from Robbins, Illinois
Philanthropists from Illinois
Singer-songwriters from Illinois
Primetime Emmy Award winners  
Disney people
Nickelodeon people